Nucor Corporation is an American producer of steel and related products based in Charlotte, North Carolina. It is the largest steel producer in the United States, the largest "mini-mill" steelmaker (i.e. it uses electric arc furnaces to melt scrap steel as opposed to blast furnaces to melt iron), and the biggest recycler of scrap in North America. 

, Nucor was the 15th-largest steel producer in the world.

Current operations
Nucor operates 23 scrap-based steel production mills. In 2019, the company produced and sold approximately 18.6 million tons of steel and recycled 17.8 million tons of scrap.

Nucor produces steel bars (carbon and alloy steel), beams, sheets/flat rolled steel, plates, steel joists, joist girders, steel decks, fabricated concrete reinforcing steel, cold finished steel, steel fasteners, metal building systems, light gauge steel framing, steel grating, expanded metal, and wire mesh. In addition to steel, Nucor also brokers ferrous and nonferrous metals such as pig iron and HRI/DRI, supplies ferro-alloys, and processes ferrous and nonferrous scrap through its The David J. Joseph Company subsidiary.

None of Nucor's mills are unionized and the corporate culture is opposed to trade unions.

Divisions
Nucor operates many independent subsidiaries, including:
 Nucor Steel Operations: Located in Alabama, Arizona, Arkansas, Florida, Illinois, Indiana, Kentucky, Missouri, Mississippi, Nebraska, North Carolina, South Carolina, Ohio, Tennessee, Texas, Utah, and Washington. These plants use mini-mills (electric arc furnaces and continuous casting technologies) to recycle steel. The Nucor Steel plant in Louisiana and Nu-Iron in Trinidad produce direct reduced iron, which is used in electric arc furnaces to supplement iron units in Nucor’s steel recycling operations. 
Duferdofin: A joint venture between Nucor and Duferco based in Italy - produces merchant bar.
 Nucor Cold Finish: Located in Canada (Laurel), Georgia, Missouri, Nebraska, Ohio, South Carolina, Utah and Wisconsin. These facilities use hot rolled steel bar to produce cold drawn bar using a process known as drawing. 
 Nucor owns several steel joist and engineered building divisions, including Vulcraft (AL, IN, NE, NY, SC, TX, UT, Ontario, Alberta), Nucor Building Systems (IN, SC, TX, UT), American Buildings Company (AL, IL, CA, VA), CBC Steel Buildings (CA), Kirby Building Systems (TN) and Verco Decking.
 Nucor Fastener: Based in Indiana. Produces carbon and alloy steel standard and special screws, bolts, and nuts. 
 Harris Rebar: A fabricator, installer and distributor of concrete reinforcing steel and related products. Harris Supply Solutions is a distributor of steel and concrete products including rebar, black rebar, epoxy coated rebar, fabricated rebar, and steel remesh.
 Nucor Skyline: A steel foundation supplier serving the American, Canadian, Mexican, Caribbean, Central American, and Colombian markets.
 The David J. Joseph Company: An 80 facility scrap metal firm providing ferrous and nonferrous metal brokerage, recycling, rail transportation, and idustrial scrap management to North America and Singapore. DJJ created the wholly-owned subsidiary of U-Pull-&-Pay that operated a chain of self-service auto parts stores, which subsidiary was sold to Pull-A-Part in 2022.
 Nucor Sales: Offices in the United States, Colombia, Mexico, Switzerland, and the United Arab Emirates.

History
Nucor's origins are with auto manufacturer Ransom E. Olds, who founded Olds Motor Vehicle Company in 1897 (the company later became Oldsmobile, part of General Motors Corporation). In 1905, Olds left Oldsmobile and established a new company, REO Motor Car Company, in Lansing, Michigan. Although REO's products (including the luxurious REO Flying Cloud car and REO Speed Wagon truck) were popular, they were not profitable, and the company filed for bankruptcy in 1938.

After the bankruptcy reorganization, REO shifted its focus from cars to trucks, but continued to suffer losses. In December 1954, REO sold its entire manufacturing operations to Bohn Aluminum and Brass Corporation.

The company initiated liquidation proceedings after the sale of its operations, but a group of dissident activist shareholders, noticing the existence of a usable tax loss, successfully challenged the liquidation in a proxy fight in September 1955 and forced REO to take over a tiny nuclear services company called Nuclear Consultants, Inc. in a reverse takeover. The company was renamed "Nuclear Corporation of America Inc." and relocated to offices in the Empire State Building in New York City. The organization's attempt to recast itself as a nuclear industry services company was unsuccessful, and it followed the example of other companies in the 1950s and 60s by attempting to become a conglomerate, moving its headquarters to Phoenix, Arizona. It made several acquisitions, including the Vulcraft Corporation, a steel joist manufacturer located in Florence, South Carolina. Vulcraft was founded by Sanborn Chase, who died at an early age, leaving the company to his widow. Nuclear purchased Vulcraft from Chase's widow in 1962 and hired F. Kenneth Iverson as general manager. In March 1965, the company again filed for bankruptcy. The Board of Directors fired Nuclear's President, but could not find a replacement. Eventually Samuel Siegel, an accountant with Nuclear and friend of Iverson, who had been looking to leave the company, informed the Board that he would remain with them under two conditions: Iverson would become President and he (Siegel) would become CFO. The Board accepted.

Iverson and Siegel reorganized Nucor around its only profitable business, the steel fabricator Vulcraft. All other businesses were either sold or liquidated. In 1966, the company moved its headquarters to Charlotte, North Carolina to be closer to its main Vulcraft plant.

In 1968, unable to get favorable steel prices from American manufacturers and unhappy with the imported steel available at the time, Iverson, a metallurgist by training, decided to extend Nucor vertically into steelmaking by building its first steel bar mill in Darlington, South Carolina. The company chose to purchase an electric arc furnace, which was far cheaper than the traditional steel blast furnace with a $6 million loan secured by all of the company's assets. Production delays and staffing problems caused the company's stock to drop to pennies, but earnings soared in 1971 and 1972.

In 1972, the company, recognizing that it was now misnamed, adopted its current title, Nucor Corporation. Nucor saw the demand for low cost commodity steel products (e.g. rebar) and started producing them. They began selling steel to other companies that had previously been importing inferior quality steel.

Since its reorganization, Nucor has become a leader in recycling technology and expanded its market presence. In 1988, Nucor became the first steel recycler to manufacture wide flange beams with a depth of 40". The company opened its building products division that same year.

In 1989, Nucor opened a facility in Crawfordsville, Indiana, the first mini mill in the world to produce flat rolled steel using thin-slab technology.

In March 2000, a joint venture, owned 47.5% by Nucor, 47.5% by BlueScope, and 5% by IHI Corporation was formed to license Castrip technology. This technology allowed for continuous casting of sheet steel directly from molten steel without the need for heavy, expensive, and energy-consuming rollers. As a result, mills built with this technology are significantly cheaper and take up significantly less space than other mills.

In September 2000, Dan DiMicco, formerly the general manager of the company's highly profitable Nucor-Yamato Steel joint venture, was appointed CEO.

In the years that followed, the company made several acquisitions; in 2001, the company acquired Auburn Steel, its first acquisition in 36 years. In 2002, Nucor bought Birmingham Steel, including the Mississippi Steel plant and Birmingham, Alabama operations. In 2004, Nucor acquired Corus Tuscaloosa, and in 2005, they purchased Fort Howard Steel and Marion Steel. In 2006, Nucor acquired Connecticut Steel, Verco Decking, and Harris Steel. The $1.07 billion acquisition of Harris Steel expanded Nucor into production of fabricated rebar, which had a strong market due to increased spending on infrastructure. In 2007, the company's Nucor Building Systems division acquired Magnatrax, which bolstered its share of the pre-engineered metal building systems market. In March 2008, Nucor purchased the David J. Joseph Company, one of the largest scrap brokers and recycling companies in the United States, in order to take more control of its raw material supply and prices. In 2012, Nucor purchased Skyline Steel.

John J. Ferriola was named as Chief Executive Officer of Nucor, and Daniel R. DiMicco was named Executive Chairman, effective from January 1, 2013. DiMicco retired on January 1, 2014.

In 2014, the company purchased Gallatin Steel Company. In 2015, the company acquired additional cold finish bar facilities in Ohio and Georgia. In 2016, Nucor announced the acquisition of a steel plate mill in Longview, Texas, and structural tube mills in Mississippi, Alabama, and Illinois. The acquisition of these facilities expanded Nucor's capabilities in the plate market and added structural tube to the company's product mix.

In April 2017, the company announced an $85 million upgrade of the rolling mill at its Marion, Ohio rebar and signpost operation.

In August 2017, the company acquired St. Louis Cold Drawn, Inc.

On September 6, 2019, Nucor announced that John Ferriola (CEO) would retire at the end of the year and would be replaced by Leon J. Topalian.

In December 2019, the company announced the acquisition of TrueCore Insulated Panels.

In March 2020, the company's joint venture with JFE Steel in Mexico began production.

In June 2021, the company announced the acquisition of the insulated metal panel business from Cornerstone Building Products.

In December 2021, Nucor acquired a majority share in California Steel Industries.

Controversies

Environmental record
In 2000, Nucor paid $98 million to settle with the United States Department of Justice and the United States Environmental Protection Agency to resolve allegations that it had not adequately controlled the emission of toxic chemicals into the air, water, and soil in Alabama, Arkansas, Indiana, Nebraska, South Carolina, Texas, and Utah. The settlement was "the largest and most comprehensive environmental settlement ever with a steel manufacturer."

In 2012, as part of a settlement with the United States Environmental Protection Agency, the company agreed to reduce air pollution at its plant in Marion, Ohio.

In 2016, the company unsuccessfully filed a lawsuit to block the Environmental Protection Agency from adopting a plan to control visible pollution in Arkansas.

See also
 List of steel producers

References

External links

Companies listed on the New York Stock Exchange
Manufacturing companies based in North Carolina
Companies based in Charlotte, North Carolina
Steel companies of the United States
Manufacturing companies established in 1955
1955 establishments in New York City
American companies established in 1955